Air Conflicts is an arcade combat flight simulator video game set in World War II. It was developed by 3Division Entertainment and published by Frogster Interactive. The game was released in April 2006.

Gameplay
The player controls a plane whose allegiance is one of three World War II nations: UK, USSR, or Nazi Germany. The game ignores factions such as USA, Japan, and Italy. Each nation has several unique fighter planes which are collected and then used during the campaign.  The campaign spans the entire course of the war. During the single-player campaign the player earns stats, achievements, new planes, and commendations.

The game also comes with multi-player for Internet TCP/IP. Up to 8 players can play at once. All the planes can be chosen and different skins can be added for personal customization. Both Deathmatch and Team Deathmatch are available game styles.

The graphics are fairly decent for a 2006 flight game. There is a large variety of multi-player and single-player maps and locations to play in. There is a lack of voice-over in the game and instead focuses on machine sounds and music.

The game has several spinoffs, including the recent Air Conflicts: Vietnam in 2014. Air Conflicts: Aces of World War II was released in 2009, Air Conflicts: Secret Wars in 2011, and Air Conflicts: Pacific Carriers in 2012, creating a trilogy of Air Conflicts games.

References 

2006 video games
World War II flight simulation video games
Video games developed in Slovakia
Windows games
Windows-only games
Multiplayer and single-player video games
Frogster Interactive Pictures games